The 1988–89 Arkansas–Little Rock Trojans men's basketball team represented the University of Arkansas at Little Rock during the 1988–89 NCAA Division I men's basketball season. The Trojans, led by head coach Mike Newell, played their home games at Barton Coliseum and were members of the Trans America Athletic Conference. They finished the season with a record of 23–8, 14–4 in TAAC play. They won the 1989 TAAC men's basketball tournament to earn an automatic bid in the 1989 NCAA Division I men's basketball tournament. They lost in the first round to Louisville, 76–71.

Roster

Schedule and results
 
|-
!colspan=9| Regular season

|-
!colspan=9| TAAC tournament

|-
!colspan=9| NCAA tournament

Rankings

References

Little Rock Trojans men's basketball seasons
Arkansas-Little Rock
Arkansas-Little Rock
Arkansas-Little Rock Trojans men's basketball team
Arkansas-Little Rock Trojans men's basketball team